Tenderfoot Mountain is a mountain east of Dillon in Summit County, Colorado. Swan Mountain lies south of Tenderfoot Mountain and Dillon Reservoir is located southwest.

References

See also
 Tenderfoot Mtn. Trail System on U. S. Department of Agriculture, Dillon Ranger District

Mountains of Colorado
Mountains of Summit County, Colorado
North American 3000 m summits